MCPS can refer to:

Mechanical-Copyright Protection Society
Member of College of Physicians and Surgeons, a membership offered by the College of Physicians and Surgeons Pakistan
Microsoft Cordless Phone System, the first phone produced by Microsoft
Minnesota Center for Philosophy of Science, at the University of Minnesota, Twin Cities
Millions of cycles per second (better known as Megahertz), a frequency measure used for processing speed in computers
Media Access Control (MAC) Common Part Sublayer
Modular Command Post System

 Schools and school districts
Maury County Public Schools
Montgomery Catholic Preparatory School, Montgomery, Alabama
 Montgomery County Public Schools (Maryland)
 Montgomery County Public Schools (Virginia)
McCracken County Public Schools
Marion County Public Schools, Marion County, Florida